The 1916 Penn State Nittany Lions football team represented the Pennsylvania State University in the 1916 college football season. The team was coached by Dick Harlow, with Lawrence Whitney as an assistant coach, and played its home games in New Beaver Field in State College, Pennsylvania.

Schedule

References

Penn State
Penn State Nittany Lions football seasons
Penn State Nittany Lions football